Vadim Kutsenko (born March 13, 1977) is a professional Uzbekistani tennis player.

Kutsenko reached his highest individual ranking on the ATP Tour on June 17, 2002, when he became World number 140.  He primarily plays on the Futures circuit and the Challenger circuit.

Kutsenko's best performance at a Grand Slam event came at the 2003 Australian Open, where he reached the second round.

Kutsenko has been a member of the Uzbekistani Davis Cup team, posting a 14–17 record in singles and a 6–6 record in doubles in twenty-two ties played from 1995–2004.

Kutsenko represented Uzbekistan at the 1998 and 2002 Asian Games, winning the bronze medal in the Men's Team event in both games.

ATP Challenger & ITF Futures

Titles (8)

Singles

External links
 
 
 

1977 births
Living people
Uzbekistani male tennis players
Sportspeople from Tashkent
Tennis players at the 1998 Asian Games
Tennis players at the 2002 Asian Games
Asian Games medalists in tennis
Asian Games bronze medalists for Uzbekistan
Medalists at the 1998 Asian Games
Medalists at the 2002 Asian Games
20th-century Uzbekistani people
21st-century Uzbekistani people